Hyperolius bicolor is a species of frog in the family Hyperoliidae.
It is endemic to Angola.
Its natural habitats are rivers, freshwater marshes, and intermittent freshwater marshes.

References

bicolor
Endemic fauna of Angola
Amphibians described in 1931
Taxonomy articles created by Polbot